Bruno da Mota Miranda (born 22 May 1995), known as Bruno Mota, is a Brazilian footballer who plays as an attacking midfielder for São Caetano.

Club career
Born in Curitiba, Paraná, Bruno Mota joined Atlético Paranaense's youth setup in 2010, after starting it out at Internacional. He made his senior debut on 22 February 2015, coming on as a half-time substitute in a 0–2 away loss against Coritiba for the Campeonato Paranaense championship.

After being definitely promoted to the main squad in March, Bruno Mota made his Série A debut on 19 July 2015, starting in a 1–0 home win against Chapecoense. He scored his first goal in the category on 27 September, scoring his team's only in a 1–2 home loss against Ponte Preta.

Honours
CSA
Campeonato Alagoano: 2021

References

External links
Atlético Paranaense profile 

1995 births
Living people
Footballers from Curitiba
Brazilian footballers
Association football midfielders
Campeonato Brasileiro Série A players
Campeonato Brasileiro Série B players
Club Athletico Paranaense players
Clube Náutico Capibaribe players
Associação Portuguesa de Desportos players
Süper Lig players
Gaziantepspor footballers
Swiss Challenge League players
Neuchâtel Xamax FCS players
PAE Kerkyra players
Treze Futebol Clube players
Centro Sportivo Alagoano players
Tombense Futebol Clube players
Associação Desportiva São Caetano players
Brazilian expatriate footballers
Brazilian expatriate sportspeople in Turkey
Brazilian expatriate sportspeople in Switzerland
Brazilian expatriate sportspeople in Greece
Expatriate footballers in Turkey
Expatriate footballers in Switzerland
Expatriate footballers in Greece